Malokarachayevsky District (Gitçe Qaraçay rayon) is an administrative and a municipal district (raion), one of the ten in the Karachay-Cherkess Republic, Russia. It is located in the east of the republic. Its administrative center is the rural locality (a selo) of Uchkeken. As of the 2010 Census, the total population of the district was 43,318, with the population of Uchkeken accounting for 38.1% of that number.

Administrative and municipal status
Within the framework of administrative divisions, Malokarachayevsky District is one of the ten in the Karachay-Cherkess Republic and has administrative jurisdiction over all of its fourteen rural localities. As a municipal division, the district is incorporated as Malokarachayevsky Municipal District. Its fourteen rural localities are incorporated into ten rural settlements within the municipal district. The selo of Uchkeken serves as the administrative center of both the administrative and municipal district.

References

Notes

Sources

Districts of Karachay-Cherkessia
